2BR02B: To Be or Naught to Be is a 2016 Canadian short science fiction film directed by Marco Checa Garcia and based on the 1962 short story "2 B R 0 2 B" by Kurt Vonnegut. The film was an international collaboration over nearly three years, with additional crew in Sydney, London, Mexico, and the Netherlands. The film features a cameo voice role by veteran actor and The X-Files star William B. Davis. The film's sound was designed by BAFTA-winner Martin Cantwell.

Premise 
In 2204, the Earth has become a dystopian wasteland. To maintain strict population levels, no newborn is permitted to live unless another person's life is traded in, and a receipt issued. Edward K. Wehling, Jr. sits in Chicago's Lying-In Hospital waiting for the birth of his triplets, but he has no receipts to collect them.

Cast
 Mackenzie Gray as Dr. Hitz
 Tyler Johnston as Edward K. Wehling, Jr.
 Jason Diablo as the Painter
 Melissa Roxburgh as Leora Duncan
 Artin John as the Orderly
 William B. Davis as the voice of Granddad

Production 
An IndieGoGo crowdfunding campaign was announced in a press release on 20 November 2013. Shortly after, it was announced that actor Paul Giamatti was attached to the project as the character Dr. Hitz. Actor Mackenzie Gray took the role of Dr. Hitz after Giamatti left due to scheduling conflicts.

The film's visual design was prepared by artists working from Vancouver, Sydney, and the Netherlands. Filming took place over three days at the Waterfall Building in Canada. Visual effects were mostly done by Facet School of VFX, Mexico. The film was edited in Vancouver, but its picture lock was undone and post-production was moved to Sydney for editing, additional visual effects and music. Sound designer Martin Cantwell joined the project, working from London.

Music 
The film's soundtrack makes extensive use of Schubert's Ave Maria in a version recorded especially for the film by Australian soprano and conductor Dr. Imogen Coward.

Release 
The film premiered at the Sci-Fi-London festival on 29 April 2016, and later in Los Angeles at the Oscar-qualifying HollyShorts Film Festival. Shortly after, the film was selected for the Oscar-qualifying LA Shorts Fest.

Reception 
2BR02B: To Be or Naught to Be received positive reviews from critics, festival organizers and festival audiences. Daniel Abella, director of the New York Science Fiction Festival, called it one of the six must-see films of the festival and Outer Place critic Chris Mahon described it as "well-executed and beautifully shot." WILDsound Fest's official full-length review of the film by Kierston Drier described it as "one of those rare gems of short cinema that will set your philosophical mind in motion... There is a level of polish and richness that any lover of science fiction and literature will appreciate and admire." Screenwriter and Motherboard contributor Michael L. Piel praised how the adaptation "unfolds like a finely-tuned play, revealing world and character details at a steady, controlled pace." John Vaughan, director of The Golden Blasters (The National Irish Science Fiction Film Festival) described the film as "An unconventional short film... it captures the sense of unease that would come if you glimpsed this particular future." Dumbbells & Dragons critic Rachel Bohlen rated the film as her third favourite from the HollyShorts Film Festival (Los Angeles), describing the film as a "terrifying view of our future" and that the adaptation "adheres almost completely to the short story, and I must warn you – there's no happy ending here. It's bleak but thought-provoking." Lund International Film Festival's Jimmy Seiersen described the film as "suspenseful and thoughtful."

Both the film's art direction and soundtrack have also received critical praise. CEO of WILDsound Fest, Matthew Toffolo and the festival's audience praised Leon Coward's interpretation of The Happy Garden of Life mural into a complex, story-rich work of art, concluding that "from a cinematic point of view... they did nail it." In an essay/interview published in The Schubertian (Journal of the Schubert Institute UK), Anna Black described the soundtrack's use of Schubert's Ave Maria as "a lasting and haunting shred of beauty and humanity in a future where it has otherwise been abandoned."

Festival selections, awards, and nominations

The film screened at VonnegutFest in November 2017 at the Kurt Vonnegut Museum and Library, Indianapolis.

The film screened, accompanied by a talk "Vonnegut's 2BR02B on screen: the art and music of the 2016 adaptation (dir. Marco Checa Garcia)", at the joint NZMS (New Zealand Musicological Society) & MSA (Musicological Society of Australia) conference in Auckland, December 2017.

References

External links 
 Official Trailer on YouTube
 Official Facebook
 2BR02B: To Be or Naught to Be at the Internet Movie Database
 WILDsound Fest Audience Video on YouTube

2016 science fiction films
2016 short films
Canadian science fiction short films
2010s dystopian films
Canadian independent films
Films based on science fiction short stories
Films set in the future
2016 independent films
Crowdfunded films
Indiegogo projects
2010s English-language films
2010s Canadian films